Mount Valhalla is a peak in the Asgard Range, Victoria Land, standing at the west flank of Valhalla Glacier from where it overlooks the south side of Wright Valley. The name is one in a group in the range derived from Norse mythology, Valhalla being the great hall where Odin receives and feasts the souls of heroes who have fallen bravely in battle. The name was suggested by Advisory Committee on Antarctic Names (US-ACAN) in consultation with New Zealand Antarctic Place-Names Committee (NZ-APC).

Mountains of the Asgard Range
McMurdo Dry Valleys